Niklas Bergqvist (born 6 October 1962 in Stockholm), is a Swedish songwriter, producer and musician. His career started in 1984, as a founding member of the Synthpop band Shanghai, which he started along his school friends. The band released two albums and numerous singles, with their debut single "Ballerina", produced by former Europe guitarist Kee Marcello.

Following the success of the single, the album also gained positive attention, resulting in the band touring around Sweden. The second, and final, studio album was produced by Swedish pop star Harpo. After the band split-up in 1987, Bergqvist formed and played in several other bands until he decided to focus more on songwriting, resulting in several releases ever since. In 2015, he founded the independent record label Tracks of Sweden with songwriting partner Simon Johansson.

Performing Artist

Studio albums

Singles

Songwriting

Entries in Eurovision Song Contest Pre-Selections 
2016

  "In My World" by Ruslanas Kirilkinas (Lithuania 2016), 6th
  "Life Is On Your Side" by Celina Ann (Austria 2016), Eliminated

2018

  "Dying Inside" by Valdas Lacko (Lithuania 2018), 10th (first round)
  "World On Fire" by Anastasia Malashkevich (Belarus 2018), 6th
  "Holding You" by Yevgeniy Dolich (Belarus 2018), Eliminated
  "Dance In Flames" by Doinița Gherman (Moldova 2018), 3rd
  "Endlessly" by Anna Timofei (Moldova 2018), 11th
  "Momentum" by Monika Urlik (Poland 2018), 3rd

2019

  "Dare" by Valdas Lacko (Lithuania 2019), 12th (first round)
  "A Better You" by Yevgeniy Dolich (Belarus 2019), Eliminated

2020

  "Every Hour" by July (Belarus 2020), Eliminated
  "Invisible" by Anastasia Malashkevich (Belarus 2020), 5th

2021

  "The Way I Am" by Donata (Lithuania 2021), 7th (first round)

2022

  "Remember" by Stelian (Romania 2022), Eliminated (semi-final)

References 

1962 births
Living people
Swedish songwriters